Hawak Ko ang Langit (International title: Heaven in My Hands / ) is a 2003 Philippine television drama series broadcast by GMA Network. Directed by Gina Alajar, it stars Assunta de Rossi and Jomari Yllana. It premiered on July 14, 2003. The series concluded on November 7, 2003 with a total of 85 episodes. It was replaced by Walang Hanggan in its timeslot.

Cast and characters

Lead cast
 Assunta de Rossi as Lorena
 Jomari Yllana as Julian

Supporting cast
 Melanie Marquez as Amapolla
 Regine Tolentino as Rebecca
 Rustom Padilla (now known as BB Gandanghari)
 Jeffrey Quizon
 Jao Mapa
 Jake Roxas
 Carlos Morales
 John Apacible
 Shamaine Centenera-Buencamino
 Nonie Buencamino
 Anna Larrucea
 Sarah Jane Abad
 Shyr Valdez
 BJ de Jesus

References

External links
 

2003 Philippine television series debuts
2003 Philippine television series endings
Filipino-language television shows
GMA Network drama series
Television series by TAPE Inc.
Television shows set in the Philippines